Jan Hansen (born 18 February 1970) is a Danish lightweight rower. He won a gold medal at the 1992 World Rowing Championships in Montreal with the lightweight men's eight.

References

1970 births
Living people
Danish male rowers
World Rowing Championships medalists for Denmark